Gary Elkins may refer to:

 Gary Elkins (footballer) (born 1966), English footballer
 Gary Elkins (politician) (born 1955), businessman and politician in Texas